Portonovo S. Ayyaswamy  (born March 21, 1942) is an Indian-born-American mechanical engineer, the Asa Whitney Professor of Dynamical Engineering at the University of Pennsylvania, Philadelphia, USA, and inventor.

He is known for his work on phase-change heat/mass transfer with droplets and bubbles, multi-phase flows, buoyancy-driven transport, and ionized arc-plasma transport with applications in condensation, combustion, microelectronic packaging, and micro-/macro-biological systems. He is the recipient of the 2014 Max Jakob Memorial Award.

Biography

Youth, education and academic career 
Ayyaswamy was born in Bangalore, India in 1942, and became a US citizen in 1975. He earned his B.E. in 1962 from University of Mysore, India. Next he obtained his M.S. in 1965, and his M.E. in 1967, both from Columbia University. In 1971 he obtained his PhD in Mechanical Engineering from the University of California, Los Angeles.

From 1971–1973 he was a post-doctoral scholar at University of California, Los Angeles, where he conducted research on capillary flows in grooved surfaces, large scale safety of nuclear reactors and bounding theories in turbulence. He then joined the faculty of the University of Pennsylvania late 1974 as assistant professor of mechanical engineering, and rose through the ranks and now is the Asa Whitney Professor of Mechanical Engineering.

Awards honours and other activities 
Ayyaswamy has won many awards for his research. His national and international awards and honors include ASME 2007 Worcester Reed Warner Medal, ASME 2001 Heat Transfer Memorial Award in the Science Category, Council of Indian Organizations Award, ASME Outstanding Faculty Advisor Award, Am. Inst. Aeronautics and Astronautics Aerospace Professional of the Year (1997) award,

He was also elected Panelist for Review of NASA Strategic Roadmaps: Space Station Panel (2005), Elected Fellow of ASME (1990) and Visiting Professor of Dept. of Mech. Eng., University of California, Berkeley, CA (2000).

Ayyaswamy has also won several teaching awards which include Lindback Award and Reid Warren Award for Distinguished Teaching.

Selected publications 
 Sadhal, Satwindar, Portonovo S. Ayyaswamy, and Jacob N. Chung. Transport phenomena with drops and bubbles. Springer Science & Business Media, 1997; 2012.

Articles, a selection
 Ayyaswamy, P. S., I. Catton, and D. K. Edwards. "Capillary flow in triangular grooves." ASME J. Appl. Mech 41.2 (1974): 248-265.
 Catton, Ivan, P. S. Ayyaswamy, and R. M. Clever. "Natural convection flow in a finite, rectangular slot arbitrarily oriented with respect to the gravity vector." International Journal of Heat and Mass Transfer 17.2 (1974): 173-184.
 Baish, J. W., P. S. Ayyaswamy, and K. R. Foster. "Heat transport mechanisms in vascular tissues: a model comparison." Journal of biomechanical engineering 108.4 (1986): 324-331.
 Qiu, Qing-Qing, Paul Ducheyne, and Portonovo S. Ayyaswamy. "Fabrication, characterization and evaluation of bioceramic hollow microspheres used as microcarriers for 3-D bone tissue formation in rotating bioreactors." Biomaterials 20.11 (1999): 989-1001.

Patents
 Ducheyne, Paul, Portonovo S. Ayyaswamy, and Qing-Qing Qiu. "Bioactive, degradable composite for tissue engineering." U.S. Patent No. 6,328,990. Dec. 11, 2001.
 Radin, S., Ducheyne, P., Falaize, S., & Ayyaswamy, P. S. "Hollow bone mineral-like calcium phosphate particles." U.S. Patent No. 6,416,774. Dec. 11, 2001.

References

External links 
 Portonovo S. Ayyaswamy - Penn Engineering

1942 births
Living people
American mechanical engineers
American academics of Indian descent
Indian emigrants to the United States
University of Mysore alumni
UCLA Henry Samueli School of Engineering and Applied Science alumni
Columbia School of Engineering and Applied Science alumni
University of Pennsylvania faculty
Fellows of the American Society of Mechanical Engineers
Scientists from Bangalore
Engineers from Karnataka
Indian scholars